Throughout the world there are many cities that were once national capitals but no longer have that status because the country ceased to exist, the capital was moved, or the capital city was renamed. This is a list of such cities, sorted by country and then by date. Where a city name has changed, the name of the city when it was a capital is listed first, followed by its modern name in brackets.

Africa

Northern Africa

Western Africa

Central Africa

Eastern Africa

Southern Africa

Asia

Northern Asia

Central Asia

Southwest Asia

South Asia

Southeast Asia

East Asia

Europe

Northern Europe

Southern Europe

Western Europe

Eastern Europe

Southeastern Europe

Central Europe

Oceania

Notes

North America

South America

See also
 List of capitals of Burma
 Historical capitals of China
 List of current and former capitals of subdivisions of China
 List of historical capitals of Egypt
 List of capitals of France
 Capital of Germany
 List of capitals of India
 Historical capitals of Norway
 List of capitals in the United States
 Institutional seats of the European Union
 List of former sovereign states
 List of sovereign states by date of formation

References

National